WAZZ (1490 AM, "My Kiss Radio 93.5") is a Top 40 (CHR) radio station in Fayetteville, North Carolina, owned by Beasley Media Group, LLC., and is "Never More Than 60 Seconds Away From Music".  Its studios and transmitter are located separately in Fayetteville.

History
WFLB signed on February 18, 1948 with John M. Croft as general manager. WFLB was a commercial radio station in Fayetteville, North Carolina. Significant local programs produced by the station included 3-B Time, with disc jockey Bill Bowser, in 1948.

In the 1950s, the station signed on a TV outlet, WFLB-TV 18, which folded later in the 1950s.

Starting in the mid-1950s, WFLB played what was called Top 40.

Newsman Johnny Joyce was the leading radio news anchor in Fayetteville.  He worked at WFLB (AM) until the late 1970s where he joined WFAI (AM).

In the late 1970s, WFLB (AM) was a top 40 powerhouse in Fayetteville, North Carolina radio market. The station featured on air personalities Larry "Records" Cannon, Andy "Stonewall" Jackson, Debbi Tanna, John Braxton and Mark McKay.  Mark McKay currently is 25-year veteran sports anchor for CNN.

In 1991, station owners Henry Hoot and Rev. Gardner Altman also owned WFAI, which began playing traditional gospel artists such as Shirley Caesar, Willie Neal Johnson and The Gospel Keynotes, and the Rev. James Cleveland, while WFLB would play The Kingsmen, Chuck Wagon Gang and The Bishops.

WFLB switched to adult standards in December 1994.

On August 1, 1996, WFLB went off the air when Beasley Broadcast Group bought WFLB along with
WAZZ and WEWO.

WFLB ("The Memories Station") returned to the air in February 1997, with Curt Nunnery bringing back "Curt's Coffee Club," which he had hosted for more than 30 years on WFAI. He was station manager on WFLB before 1994.

Soon after that in 1997, WFLB swapped call signs with WAZZ.

On October 9, 2014, WAZZ changed their format to soft adult contemporary, branded as "Sunny 94.3" (also broadcast on FM translator W232CI 94.3 FM Fayetteville).

On January 5, 2018, WAZZ changed formats to top 40 CHR, branded as "My Kiss Radio" (which simulcasts on a translator on 93.5 FM).

Previous logos

References

External links
WAZZ official website

AZZ
Contemporary hit radio stations in the United States
Radio stations established in 1948
AZZ